Ofer Prison (Kele Ofer), formerly officially known as Incarceration Facility 385, is an Israeli incarceration facility ( mitkan kli'a, abbr. Matak) located in the West Bank, between Ramallah/Beituniya and Giv'at Ze'ev. It is one of three facilities of the same nature, including the Megiddo and Ktzi'ot prisons, the latter two located in Israel and not in the West Bank.

Ofer Prison is run by the Israel Prison Service and like the other two facilities, used to be operated by the Israel Defense Forces' Military Police Corps.

When under IDF control, it was capable of holding up to 800 prisoners, both tried and those under administrative detention. As of September 2016, it holds about 1,250 Palestinian prisoners.

History
Camp Ofer was founded in December 1968, at the location of a former Jordanian Army base from before the Six-Day War. It was named after lieutenant colonel Zvi Ofer, the commander of the Haruv Reconnaissance Unit, who was killed in action earlier in the same year.

The prison was built in the base in 1988, after the onset of the First Intifada. Following the Oslo Accords, and the numerous prisoner releases of 1995, Ofer's remaining prisoners and detainees were moved to Megiddo Prison, and Ofer was closed.

It was finally officially re-opened on March 29, 2002, as part of Operation Defensive Shield. Its full construction was set to be completed on August 10, 2002.

On October 3, 2006, control of Ofer Prison was moved to the Israel Prison Service, making it the last incarceration facility for Palestinians to be moved to the IPS (although two detention centers in the West Bank are still controlled by the Military Police Corps).

Human Rights abuses
Non-governmental organizations such has Machsom Watch have continuously reported the imprisonment of children in Ofer Prison. A delegation of British MPs visiting the facilities alleged human rights abuses:

Arguably more concerning observations were made by a delegation of leading British lawyers who also visited the facilities and observed the use of iron shackles on children, which they considered to be in breach of Article 40 of the UN Convention on the Rights of the Child and the UN Standard Minimum Rules.

Staff
As of 2006, Ofer Prison is staffed by the Israel Prison Service, which took control of it in 2006. The staff consists of jailors and officers, as well as a contingent of IPS's special unit, Rapid Response Unit (Keter), and interrogators from the Shabak.

Before IPS, the prison was run by the IDF's Military Police Corps. The staff included soldiers who completed the Palestinian detainees' jailors (Metaplei Atzurei HaShtahim) course, including the Company for Special Tasks (abbr. Palmam). The prison as a whole was a battalion-level unit, commanded by a lieutenant colonel.

Commanders
Ofer Prison is headed by Colonel Eran Fire.

References

Israel Defense Forces
Prisons in the West Bank
Judea and Samaria Area